Nicky Stéphane Medja Beloko (born 16 February 2000) is a professional footballer who plays as a midfielder for Luzern. Born in Cameroon, Beloko is a youth international for Switzerland.

Club career
Beloko made his professional debut in a 1–5 loss to BSC Young Boys on 29 October 2017, in the Swiss Super League. He was the first player born in the year 2000 to play in the Super League. 

On 18 June 2018, Beloko moved to ACF Fiorentina. He made one appearance for Fiorentina in the Serie A, having played the second half in a 0–1 loss to Sassuolo on 29 April 2019. He played a majority of the time for the reserve squad, in the Campionato Primavera 1, making 41 appearances and scoring five goals across all competitions. 

On 21 August 2019 he joined Belgian club Gent on a season-long loan with an option to buy. On 9 January 2020, Gent terminated the loan early after he made no appearances for the club up to that point.

On 16 February 2021, he joined Neuchâtel Xamax on loan for the rest of the 2020–21 season.

On 30 June 2021 he joined Neuchâtel Xamax permanently.

On 6 July 2022, he transferred to Luzern with a contract through 2025, thus making his return to the Swiss Super League.

International career
Beloko was born in Cameroon but moved to Switzerland at a young age, deciding to represent Switzerland internationally at youth levels.

References

External links
 
 SFL Profile
 SFV U19 Profile

2000 births
Living people
People from Ebolowa
Swiss men's footballers
Switzerland youth international footballers
Cameroonian footballers
Swiss people of Cameroonian descent
Swiss sportspeople of African descent
Cameroonian emigrants to Switzerland
Association football midfielders
ACF Fiorentina players
FC Sion players
K.A.A. Gent players
Neuchâtel Xamax FCS players
FC Luzern players
Swiss Promotion League players
Swiss Super League players
Serie A players
Swiss Challenge League players
Swiss expatriate footballers
Swiss expatriate sportspeople in Italy
Swiss expatriate sportspeople in Belgium
Cameroonian expatriate footballers
Cameroonian expatriate sportspeople in Italy
Cameroonian expatriate sportspeople in Belgium
Expatriate footballers in Italy
Expatriate footballers in Belgium